The 1994 Asian Basketball Confederation Championship for Women, was the 15th regional championship held by Asian Basketball Confederation. The competition was hosted by Sendai, Japan and took place between April 25 to May 1, 1994. The championship is divided into two levels: Level I and Level II. The last finisher of Level I is relegated to Level II and the top finisher of Level II qualify for Level I 1995's championship.

The tournament originally was scheduled to be held in Taiwan in November 1993 but Taiwan withdrew as host.

Preliminary round

Level I

Level II

Final round

3rd place

Final

Final standing

Awards

References
 Results
 archive.fiba.com

1994
1994 in women's basketball
women
B
B